Pinnow may refer to the following places in Germany:

 Pinnow, Brandenburg
 Pinnow, Mecklenburg-Vorpommern